The 11th Youth in Film Awards ceremony (now known as the Young Artist Award), presented by the Youth in Film Association, honored outstanding youth performers under the age of 21 in the fields of film and television for the 1988–1989 season, and took place in the spring of 1990 in Hollywood, California.

Established in 1978 by long-standing Hollywood Foreign Press Association member, Maureen Dragone, the Youth in Film Association was the first organization to establish an awards ceremony specifically set to recognize and award the contributions of performers under the age of 21 in the fields of film, television, theater and music.

Categories
★ Bold indicates the winner in each category.

Best Young Performer in a Motion Picture

Best Young Actor Starring in a Motion Picture
★ Sean Astin - Staying Together (Hemdale Film Corporation)
Kirk Cameron - Listen to Me (Columbia Pictures)
Joel Carlson - Communion (New Line Cinema)
Keith Coogan - Cheetah (Walt Disney Pictures)
Cory Danziger - The 'Burbs (Universal Studios)
Joshua Miller - Teen Witch (M.G.M.)
Leaf Phoenix - Parenthood (Universal Pictures)
Jared Rushton - Honey, I Shrunk the Kids (Walt Disney Pictures)
Fred Savage - The Wizard (Universal Pictures)
Ben Savage - Little Monsters (Vestron Pictures)

Best Young Actress Starring in a Motion Picture
★ Winona Ryder - Great Balls of Fire! (Orion Pictures)
Blaze Berdahl - Pet Sematary (Paramount Pictures)
Rebecca Harrell - Prancer (Orion Pictures)
Jenny Lewis - The Wizard (Universal Pictures)
Robyn Lively - Teen Witch (M.G.M.)
Sarah Polley - The Adventures of Baron Munchausen (Columbia Pictures)

Best Young Actor Supporting Role in a Motion Picture
★ Hugh O'Conor - My Left Foot (Miramax Films)
Kevin Dillon - Immediate Family (Columbia Pictures)
Luke Edwards - The Wizard (Universal Pictures)
Jasen Fisher - Parenthood (Universal Pictures)
Lukas Haas - Music Box (TriStar Pictures)
Ethan Hawke - Dad (Universal Pictures)
Jermaine Hopkins - Lean on Me (Warner Bros)
Gabriel Damon - Tequila Sunrise (Warner Bros)
Whitby Hertford - A Nightmare on Elm Street 5: The Dream Child (New Line Cinema)

Best Young Actress Supporting Role in a Motion Picture
★ Gaby Hoffmann - Field of Dreams (Universal Studios)Ariana Richards - Prancer (Orion Pictures)
Sarah Rowland Doroff - Three Fugitives (Touchstone Pictures)
Karen Malina White - Lean on Me (Warner Bros)
Amy O'Neill - Honey, I Shrunk the Kids (Walt Disney Pictures)
Kala Savage - Little Monsters (Vestron Pictures)

Best Young Performer in a TV Movie, Pilot or Special

Best Young Actor Starring in a TV Movie, Pilot or Special
★ Brian Austin Green - Adventures in Babysitting (Walt Disney Television)Brian Bonsall - Do You Know the Muffin Man? (CBS)
Kevin Dillon - When He's Not a Stranger (CBS)
Cory Danziger - Married to the Mob (Orion Pictures)
Stephen Dorff - Do You Know the Muffin Man? (CBS)
Brandon Quintin Adams - Polly (NBC)
Corin Nemec - I Know My First Name Is Steven (NBC)
Jacob Vargas - Hard Time on Planet Earth (CBS)
Joey Lawrence - Adventures in Babysitting (Walt Disney Television)
Lantz Landry - No Place Like Home (CBS)

Best Young Actress Starring in a TV Movie, Pilot or Special
★ Juliet Sorcey - Taken Away (CBS)Annabeth Gish - When He's Not a Stranger (CBS)
Amy Lynne - Private Affairs (CBS)
Keshia Knight Pulliam - Polly (NBC)
Emily Schulman - Caddie Woodlawn (Churchill Films)

Best Young Performer in a Television Series

Best Young Actor Starring in a Television Series
★ Neil Patrick Harris - Doogie Howser, M.D. (ABC)Danny Ponce - The Hogan Family (ABC)
Darius McCrary - Family Matters (ABC)
Vonni Ribisi - My Two Dads (NBC)
David Faustino - Married... with Children (FOX)
Fred Savage - The Wonder Years (ABC)
Matthew Newmark - Paradise (CBS)
Jason Hervey - The Wonder Years (ABC)
Jeremy Licht - The Hogan Family (NBC)
Jeremy Miller - Growing Pains (ABC)
Danny Pintauro - Who's the Boss? (ABC)

Best Young Actress Starring in a Television Series
★ Jodie Sweetin - Full House (ABC)Candace Cameron - Full House (ABC)
Alyson Hannigan - Free Spirit (ABC)
Chelsea Hertford - Major Dad (CBS)
Staci Keanan - My Two Dads (NBC)
Lisa Rieffel - Ann Jillian (NBC)
Danica McKellar - The Wonder Years (ABC)
Jenny Beck - Paradise (CBS)

Best Young Actor Supporting Role in a Television Series
★ Malcolm-Jamal Warner - The Cosby Show (NBC)Brandon Call - Baywatch (NBC)
Kevin Telles - Life Goes On (ABC)
Luke Rossi - Thirtysomething (ABC)
Paul Scherrer - Free Spirit (ABC)
Harley Cross - Sister Kate (NBC)
Tommy Puett - Life Goes On (ABC)
Jeff Bollow - Ann Jillian (NBC)
Jason Priestley - Sister Kate (NBC)
Michael Faustino - HeartBeat (ABC)

Best Young Actress Supporting Role in a Television Series
★ Andrea Barber - Full House (ABC)Amy Hathaway - My Two Dads (NBC)
Sara Gilbert - Roseanne (ABC)
Lauren Woodland - Alien Nation (FOX)
Tempestt Bledsoe - The Cosby Show (NBC)
Kellie Martin - Life Goes On (ABC)
Lecy Goranson - Roseanne (ABC)
Heidi Zeigler - Just the Ten of Us (ABC)

Best Young Actor Guest Starring in a Television Series
★ Randy Josselyn - Family Matters (ABC)Mark Ballou - Paradise (CBS)
Michael John Burns - Paradise (CBS)
Justin Burnette - Who's the Boss? (ABC)
Scott Ferguson - Mancuso, F.B.I. (NBC)
Jason Horst - It's Garry Shandling's Show (Showtime)
Cuba Gooding, Jr. - MacGyver (ABC)
Kenny Morrison - Growing Pains (ABC)
Ryan Bollman - Life Goes On (ABC)
John Chaidez - General Hospital (ABC)
Michael Bacall - Doogie Howser, M.D. (ABC)
Michael Bays - Life Goes On (ABC)
Brandon Stewart - The Judge (Syn.)
Bobby Jacoby - The Wonder Years (ABC)
Joshua Miller - The Wonder Years (ABC)

Best Young Actress Guest Starring in a Television Series
★ Solaz - The Judge (Syn.)
Mayim Bialik - Empty Nest (NBC)
Deonca Brown - Superior Court (Warner Bros. Television)
Holly Fields - MacGyver (ABC)
Karen Lundy - Midnight Caller (NBC)
Crystal McKellar - Paradise (CBS)
Juliet Sorcey- Wolf (CBS)

Best Young Actor in an Off-Prime Time Family Series
★ Scott Nemes - It's Garry Shandling's Show (Showtime)Dustin Diamond - Saved by the Bell (NBC)
Alexander Polinsky - Charles in Charge (Syndication)
Jason Marsden - The Munsters Today (Syndication)
Will Nipper - The New Lassie (Syndication)
Jerry O'Connell - My Secret Identity (CTV)
Kevin Osgood - MMC (Disney Channel)
Damon Pampolina - MMC (Disney Channel)
John Snee - The New Leave It to Beaver (WTBS)
Wil Wheaton - Star Trek: The Next Generation (Syndication)

Best Young Actress in an Off-Prime Time Family Series
★ Lark Voorhies - Saved by the Bell (NBC)Tiffany Brissette - Small Wonder (FOX TV)
Wendy Cox - The New Lassie (Syndication)
Josie Davis - Charles in Charge (Syndication)
Nicole Eggert - Charles in Charge (Syndication)
Maureen Flannigan - Out of This World (Syndication)
Hilary Van Dyke - The Munsters Today (Syndication)

Best Young Actor in a Daytime Drama
★ R. J. Williams - General Hospital (ABC)Michael Bays  - Days of Our Lives (NBC)
Justin Gocke - Santa Barbara (NBC)
Ryan Brennan - Days of Our Lives (NBC)

Best Young Actress in a Daytime Drama
★ Ashley Peldon - Guiding Light (CBS)Kimberly McCullough - General Hospital (ABC)
Christie Clark - Days of Our Lives (NBC)
Mindy Clarke - Days of Our Lives (NBC)
Julie Condra - Santa Barbara (NBC)

Best Young Performer Under 9 Years of Age

Outstanding Performance by an Actor Under 9 Years of Age
★ Brian Bonsall - Family Ties (NBC)Michael Patrick Carter - Paradise (CBS)
Miko Hughes - Pet Sematary (Paramount Pictures)
Zachary La Voy - Parenthood (Universal Pictures)
Tony T. Johnson - Amen (NBC)

Outstanding Performance by an Actress Under 9 Years of Age
★ Mary-Kate and Ashley Olsen - Full House (ABC)Nicole Alysia - Sidewalk Stories (Island Pictures)
Brighton Hertford - General Hospital (ABC)
Raven-Symoné - The Cosby Show (NBC)
Thora - Day by Day (NBC)

Best Young Ensemble Cast

Outstanding Young Ensemble Cast
★ A Mother's Courage: The Mary Thomas Story (NBC) - Garland Spencer, A.J. Johnson, Leon, T. C. Carson, Swain Perry, Nathaniel Barnes, Robert Bady, Shamon Ricks and Larry O. WilliamsHomeroom (ABC) - B.D. Williams, Daphne Lyn Jones, Trent Cameron and Johnny Bennett
Kids Incorporated (Disney) - Love Hewitt, Sean O'Riordan, Stacy Ferguson, Kenny Ford, Devyn Puett and [Richard Shoff
Saved by the Bell (NBC) - Mark-Paul Gosselaar, Mario Lopez, Dustin Diamond, Tiffani-Amber Thiessen, Elizabeth Berkley and Lark Voorhies
Degrassi Junior High (CBC Television) - Dayo Ade, Sara Ballingall, Stefan Brogren, Michael Carry, Christopher Charlesworth, Amanda Cook, Irene Courakos, Angela Deiseach, Anais Granofsky, Rebecca Haines, Neil Hope, Cathy Keenan, Pat Mastroianni, Maureen McKay, Stacie Mistysyn, Bill Parrott, Siluck Saysanasy, Amanda Stepto and Duncan Waugh

Best Family Television Entertainment

Best Family TV Movie Pilot or Special
★ I Know My First Name Is Steven (NBC)Free to Be... A Family (Landmark)
CBS Schoolbreak Special - Frog Girl, The Jennifer Graham Story (CBS)
No Place Like Home (Orion Television)
When He's Not a Stranger (CBS)

Best New Television Series
★ Major Dad (CBS)Ann Jillian (NBC)
Baywatch (NBC)
Doogie Howser, M.D. (ABC)
Family Matters (ABC)
Free Spirit (ABC)
Life Goes On (ABC)
Sister Kate (NBC)

Best Off-Prime Time Family Series
★ Out of This WorldCharles in Charge (Syn.)
The New Lassie (Syn.)
The Munsters Today (Syn.)
The New Leave It to Beaver (TBS)
Saved By the Bell (NBC)
Star Trek: The Next Generation (Syn.)
Superboy (Syn.)
My Secret Identity (CTV/Syn.)

Best Family Motion Picture Entertainment

Best Family Motion Picture: Adventure or Cartoon
★ The Little Mermaid (Disney)All Dogs Go to Heaven (MGM - UA)
The Adventures of Milo and Otis (Columbia)
Babar: The Movie (New Line Cinema)
The Bear (Tri - Star)

Best Family Motion Picture: Musical or Fantasy
★ Back to the Future Part II (Universal)The Adventures of Baron von Munchausen (Columbia)
The Abyss (20th Century Fox)
Batman (Warner Bros.)

Best Family Motion Picture: Comedy
★ Parenthood (Universal)Ghostbusters II (Columbia)
Honey, I Shrunk the Kids (Buena Vista)
Look Who's Talking (Tri-Star)
The Wizard (Universal)
Turner & Hooch (Buena Vista)

Best Motion Picture: Drama
★ Dead Poets Society (Touchstone)Dad (Universal)
Immediate Family (Columbia)
Lean on Me (Warner Bros.)
My Left Foot (Miramax)
Indiana Jones and the Last Crusade (Paramount)

Youth In Film's Special Awards

Former Child Star - Life Achievement Award
★ Jon Provost - LassieFormer Child Star - Life Achievement Award
★ Margaret O'Brien - Journey for MargaretThe Michael Landon Award

Outstanding Contribution to Youth through Television
★ Donna Metroff, Producer - WonderWorks PBSThe Jackie Coogan Award

Outstanding Contribution to Youth through Motion Pictures
★ Norman Twain, Producer - Lean on MeInspiration to Youth
★ Christopher Burke - Life Goes OnBest Young Actor Under 9 Appearing in a Foreign Film
★ Salvatore Cascio (Italy) - Cinema ParadisoOutstanding Young Actor in a Foreign Film
★ Max Rennie (England) - When the Whales CameOutstanding Young Actress in a Foreign Film
★ Helen Pearce (England) - When the Whales CameBest Foreign Film
★ When the Whales Came (England)'''

References

External links
Official site

Young Artist Awards ceremonies
1989 film awards
1989 television awards
1990 in California
1990 in American cinema
1990 in American television